Dilhan Pillay Sandrasegara (born 1963/1964) is a Singaporean business executive and lawyer who has been serving as the chief executive officer of Temasek Holdings since 2021.

Education
Sandrasegara attended Anglo-Chinese School (Independent) before graduating from the National University of Singapore in 1988 with a Bachelor of Laws degree. He subsequently went on to complete a Master of Laws degree at the University of Cambridge in 1990.

Career 
Sandrasegara, together with Wong Meng Meng and 9 other lawyers founded the Singaporean law firm, WongPartnership in 1992. He was a mergers and acquisitions lawyer. He became the Managing Partner in 2007, after Wong retired.

He then joined Temasek in September 2010 and held several roles such as group head for Investment, Portfolio Management and Enterprise Development. He then served as the chief executive officer (CEO) and executive director of Temasek International, the investment arm of Temasek Holdings since April 2019.

He succeeded Ho Ching as the CEO of Temasek Holdings on 1 October 2021.

References

Singaporean chief executives
National University of Singapore alumni
Alumni of the University of Cambridge
Year of birth missing (living people)
Living people